In numerical analysis, the FTCS (Forward Time Centered Space) method is a finite difference method used for numerically solving the heat equation and similar parabolic partial differential equations. It is a first-order method in time, explicit in time, and is conditionally stable when applied to the heat equation.  When used as a method for advection equations, or more generally hyperbolic partial differential equations, it is unstable unless artificial viscosity is included. The abbreviation FTCS was first used by Patrick Roache.

The method
The FTCS method is based on central difference in space and the forward Euler method in time, giving first-order convergence in time and second-order convergence in space. For example, in one dimension, if the partial differential equation is

then, letting , the forward Euler method is given by:

The function  must be discretized spatially with a central difference scheme. FTCS method is computationally inexpensive since the method is explicit.

Illustration: one-dimensional heat equation
The FTCS method is often applied to diffusion problems. As an example, for 1D heat equation,

the FTCS scheme is given by:

or, letting :

Stability
As derived using von Neumann stability analysis, the FTCS method for the one-dimensional heat equation is numerically stable if and only if the following condition is satisfied:

A major drawback of the FTCS method is that for problems with large diffusivity , satisfactory step sizes can be too small to be practical.

For hyperbolic partial differential equations, the linear test problem is the constant coefficient
advection equation, as opposed to the heat equation (or diffusion equation), which is the correct choice for a parabolic differential equation.
It is well known that for these hyperbolic problems, any choice of
 results in an unstable scheme.

See also

Partial differential equations
Crank–Nicolson method
Finite-difference time-domain method

References

Numerical differential equations
Computational fluid dynamics